Eirik Hestad (born 26 June 1995) is a Norwegian professional footballer who plays as a midfielder for Cypriot First Division club Pafos.

Club career
In 2012, he dominated for Molde 2 in the 2. divisjon, and made his first-team debut on 25 October 2012 in a Europa League group stage match against Steaua București. He also played internationally for Norway boys-17. He made his Eliteserien debut in September 2013 in a 1–1 draw against Haugesund. On 30 April 2019, Hestad signed a two-year contract extension that ties him to Molde until the end of the 2021 season. On 5 May 2019, Hestad got his 100th appearance in Eliteserien in Molde's 2–1 win away to Haugesund.

On 9 January 2022, Pafos announced the signing of Hestad on a free transfer after his Molde contract had expired.

International career
Hestad played a total of 28 games and scored 6 goals for Norway at international youth level.

Career statistics

Honours

Club
Molde
 Tippeligaen/Eliteserien: 2014, 2019
 Norwegian Cup: 2013, 2014

Individual
Eliteserien Top assist provider: 2019

References

1995 births
Living people
People from Fræna
Norwegian footballers
Norway under-21 international footballers
Norway youth international footballers
Molde FK players
Pafos FC players
Eliteserien players
Cypriot First Division players
Association football midfielders
Norwegian expatriate footballers
Expatriate footballers in Cyprus
Norwegian expatriate sportspeople in Cyprus
Sportspeople from Møre og Romsdal